Mac OS Hebrew is used in Apple Macintosh computers to represent Hebrew texts.

References

Character sets
Hebrew
Hebrew alphabet